Manistee Lake is a water body adjacent to the city of Manistee, Michigan. Its primary inlet, as well as its outlet, is the Manistee River, flowing to Lake Michigan.  The tributary Little Manistee River enters the southeast end of the lake before the outlet.

See also
List of lakes in Michigan

References

Michigan  Streamflow Data from the USGS

Lakes of Michigan
Lakes of Manistee County, Michigan
Tributaries of Lake Michigan